Henry Weysford Charles Plantagenet Rawdon-Hastings, 4th Marquess of Hastings and 9th Earl of Loudoun (22 July 1842 – 10 November 1868), styled Lord Henry Rawdon-Hastings from birth until 1851, was a British peer. He was also, starting from most senior barony, 21st Baron Grey of Ruthyn (of 1324), 20th Baron Botreaux (of 1368), 19th Baron Hungerford (of 1426), and 17th Baron Hastings (of 1461).

Early life
Rawdon-Hastings was the second son of George Rawdon-Hastings, 2nd Marquess of Hastings, the British peer and courtier, and his wife Barbara née Yelverton, 20th Baroness Grey de Ruthyn. His father died when Henry was only two years old, and Henry succeeded to his father's titles upon the early death of his older brother Paulyn seven years later, when Henry was aged nine. Later, in 1858, Henry inherited his mother's barony at the age of sixteen.

In 1860, The Times noted that Rawdon-Hastings was one of only three to hold peerages in all three Kingdoms of England, Scotland, and Ireland (as Earl of Moira).

Marriage

In 1862, Lord Hastings became engaged to Alice March Phillipps de Lisle, but they never married (she later married the Hon. Arthur Strutt, younger son of Lord Belper).

On 16 July 1864, he married Lady Florence Paget, the only daughter of Henry Paget, 2nd Marquess of Anglesey, from his second wife Henrietta Bagot. The marriage created a scandal as the bride had been engaged to Henry Chaplin.

He died in 1868, aged only 26, with no children. The Marquessate of Hastings became extinct, while the Earldom of Loudoun passed to his eldest sister Lady Edith and his English baronies fell into abeyance between Lady Edith and their three other sisters – all would go to Edith except their mother's, which passed to the second sister, Lady Bertha.

After his death, his widow, Florence, Marchioness of Hastings, would marry Sir George Chetwynd, 4th Baronet, on 9 July 1870.

References

External links

1842 births
1868 deaths
Henry Rawdon-Hastings 21st Baron Grey de Ruthin
Hastings family
Masters of foxhounds
Burials at Kensal Green Cemetery
4
Barons Hastings
Barons Grey of Ruthin
Barons Botreaux
Barons Hungerford